Sabs is the fourth studio album by German rapper Sabrina Setlur. Produced by Moses Pelham and Martin Haas, it was released by 3P on November 2, 2003 in German-speaking Europe, coinciding with Setlur's role as a judge on Popstars – Das Duell. Her first album in four years, it debuted and peaked at number 11 on the German Albums Chart, but was less successful than her previous albums.

Track listing
All song written by Moses Pelham, and Martin Haas.

Charts

References

Sabrina Setlur albums
2003 albums
German-language albums